Vladimir Konstantinovich Bukovsky (30 December 1942 – 27 October 2019) was a Russian-born British human rights activist and writer. From the late 1950s to the mid-1970s, he was a prominent figure in the Soviet dissident movement, well known at home and abroad. He spent a total of twelve years in the psychiatric prison-hospitals, labour camps, and prisons of the Soviet Union during Brezhnev rule.

After being expelled from the Soviet Union in late 1976, Bukovsky remained in vocal opposition to the Soviet system and the shortcomings of its successor regimes in Russia. An activist, a writer, and a neurophysiologist, he is celebrated for his part in the campaign to expose and halt the political abuse of psychiatry in the Soviet Union.

A member of the international advisory council of the Victims of Communism Memorial Foundation, a director of the Gratitude Fund (set up in 1998 to commemorate and support former dissidents), and a member of the International Council of the New York City-based Human Rights Foundation, Bukovsky was a Senior Fellow of the Cato Institute in Washington, D.C.

In 2001, Vladimir Bukovsky received the Truman-Reagan Medal of Freedom, awarded annually since 1993 by the Victims of Communism Memorial Foundation.

In 2015 he was prosecuted in the United Kingdom on the charge of possession of child pornography, but became ill and died before the case went to trial.

Early life 
Vladimir Bukovsky was born to Russian parents in the town of Belebey in the Bashkir Autonomous Soviet Socialist Republic (today the Republic of Bashkortostan in the Russian Federation), to which his family was evacuated during World War II. After the war he and his parents returned to Moscow where his father Konstantin (1908–1976) was a well-known Soviet journalist. During his last year at school Vladimir was expelled for creating and editing an unauthorised magazine. To meet the requirements to apply for a university place he completed his secondary education at evening classes. Bukovsky was enrolled at Moscow State University for biology but was kicked out at age 19, having criticised the Komsomol, i.e., the Young Communist League.

Soviet-era activism

Rallies

Mayakovsky Square
In September 1960, Bukovsky entered Moscow University to study biology. There he and some friends decided to revive the informal Mayakovsky Square poetry readings which began after a statue to the poet was unveiled in central Moscow in 1958. They made contact with earlier participants of the readings such as Vladimir Osipov, the editor of Boomerang (1960), and Yuri Galanskov who issued the Phoenix (1961), two examples of literary samizdat.

It was then that the 19-year-old Bukovsky wrote his critical notes on the Communist Youth League or Komsomol. Later, this text was given the title "Theses on the Collapse of the Komsomol" by the KGB. Bukovsky portrayed the USSR as an "illegal society" facing an acute ideological crisis. The Komsomol was "moribund", he asserted, having lost both moral and spiritual authority, and he called for its democratisation. This text, and his other activities, brought Bukovsky to the attention of the authorities. He was interrogated twice before being thrown out of the university in autumn 1961.

Bukovsky was arrested on 1 June 1963. He was later convicted, in absentia, by reason of his "insanity", under Article 70.1 ("Anti-Soviet agitation and propaganda") of the RSFSR Criminal Code. The official charge was the making and possession of photocopies of anti-Soviet literature, namely two copies of the banned work The New Class by Milovan Djilas. Bukovsky was examined by Soviet psychiatrists, declared to be mentally ill ("schizophrenia"), and sent for treatment at the Special Psychiatric Hospital in Leningrad where he remained for almost two years, until February 1965. It was there he became acquainted with General Petro Grigorenko, a fellow inmate.

The Glasnost rally, 5 December 1965
In December 1965, Bukovsky helped prepare a demonstration on Pushkin Square in central Moscow to protest against the trial of the writers Andrei Sinyavsky and Yuli Daniel. He circulated the "Civic Appeal" by mathematician and poet Alexander Esenin-Volpin, which called on the authorities to obey the Soviet laws requiring glasnost in the judicial process, e.g. the admission of the public and the media to any trial. The demonstration on 5 December 1965 (Constitution Day) became known as the Glasnost Meeting or rally, and marked the beginning of the openly active Soviet civil rights movement.

Bukovsky himself was unable to attend. Three days earlier he was arrested, charged with distributing the appeal, and kept in various psikhushkas, among them Hospital No 13 at Lublino, Stolbovaya and the Serbsky Institute, until July 1966.

The Right to Demonstrate, 1967
On 22 January 1967, Bukovsky, Vadim Delaunay, Yevgeny Kushev and Victor Khaustov held another demonstration on Pushkin Square. They were protesting against the recent arrests of Alexander Ginzburg, Yuri Galanskov, Alexei Dobrovolsky and Vera Lashkova (finally prosecuted in January 1968 in the Trial of the Four) and asserting their own right to protest: on 16 September 1966 a new law, Article 190.3, had been introduced which classified any public gatherings or demonstrations as a crime.

On 1 September 1967, at his own trial, Bukovsky used his final words to attack the regime's failure to respect the law or follow legal procedures. He invoked Article 125 of the (still current) 1936 Soviet Constitution to defend the right to organise demonstrations and other public protests. He further suggested that the prosecution had repeatedly failed to observe the revised 1961 Code of Criminal Procedure in its conduct of the case. Bukovsky's final words in court circulated widely in a samizdat collection of such addresses and as part of a collection of materials about the demonstration and subsequent trials compiled by Pavel Litvinov.

Fellow protestors Vadim Delaunay and Yevgeny Kushev admitted regret for their actions but not their guilt; they received suspended sentences and were released. Bukovsky was defiant and, like fellow demonstrator Victor Khaustov (convicted in February 1967), was given three years in an "ordinary regime" corrective-labour camp. Bukovsky was sent to Bor in the Voronezh Region to serve his sentence. He was released in January 1970.

The Campaign against the Abuse of Psychiatry

In the 1960s and 1970s, the Soviet authorities began the widespread use of psychiatric treatment as a form of punishment and deterrence for the independent-minded. This involved unlimited detention in a psikhushka, as such places were popularly known, which might be conventional psychiatric hospitals or psychiatric prison-hospitals set up (e.g. the Leningrad Special Psychiatric Hospital) as part of an existing penal institution. Healthy individuals were held among mentally ill and often dangerous patients; they were forced to take various psychotropic drugs; they might also be incarcerated in prison-type institutions under overall control of the KGB.

During a clandestine interview filmed by CBS News correspondent  Bill Cole in a forest near Moscow, Bukovsky described how the Soviet government was committing political dissidents to mental institutions and subjecting them to drug treatments.

That interview along with interviews with Andrei Amalrik and Pyotr Yakir were smuggled out of the country by Canadian diplomats and aired in 1970 in the CBS News special report "Voices from the Soviet Underground."
In 1971, Bukovsky managed to smuggle to the West over 150 pages further documenting the political abuse of psychiatric institutions in the Soviet Union. In a letter addressed to "Western psychiatrists" and written in a deliberately restrained tone, Bukovsky asked them to consider if the evidence justified the isolation of several dissidents, and urged them to discuss the matter at the next International Congress of Psychiatrists.

The documents were released to the press in March 1971 by a small French group called the International Committee for the Defence of Human Rights. Bukovsky's letter appeared on 12 March in The Times (London) and later in the British Journal of Psychiatry Bukovsky was arrested on 29 March and held in custody for nine months before being put on trial in January 1972.

The information Bukovsky had gathered and sent to the West galvanised human rights activists worldwide and those within the Soviet Union. It also struck a chord among psychiatrists. In September that year 44 European psychiatrists wrote to The Times (London) expressing grave doubts about the diagnoses of the six people concerned. At a meeting in November 1971, the World Federation for Mental Health called on its members to investigate the charges and defend the right to free opinion where it was threatened. These responses were carefully documented by the dissident human rights periodical Chronicle of Current Events, which also recorded the many statements made by Bukovsky's friends and fellow rights activists in his defence. As the person at the centre of this unprecedented international row, Bukovsky waited in almost total isolation, without access to a lawyer, to be tried and sent to the camps or a special psychiatric hospital.

Responding to public pressure, the World Psychiatric Association finally condemned Soviet practices at its Sixth World Congress in 1977 and set up a review committee to monitor misuse. In 1983, the Soviet representatives withdrew from the World Psychiatric Association rather than face expulsion. Bukovsky later characterised this reaction as "the most important victory for the dissident form of glasnost".

Final arrest (1971) and imprisonment
Following the release of the documents, Bukovsky was denounced in Pravda as a "malicious hooligan, engaged in anti-Soviet activities" and arrested on 29 March 1971. At first held in Lefortovo Prison, in August, Bukovsky spent approximately three months in the Serbsky Institute, which this time pronounced him mentally sound and able to stand trial.

During the trial in January 1972 Bukovsky was accused of slandering Soviet psychiatry, contacts with foreign journalists, and the possession and distribution of samizdat. On this occasion he again used his final words to the court to reach a much wider audience when the text circulated in samizdat. He was sentenced to two years in prison, five in a labour camp, and five more in internal exile.

While in prison Bukovsky and his fellow inmate, the psychiatrist Semyon Gluzman, wrote a brief 20-page Manual on Psychiatry for Dissidents, which was widely published abroad, in Russian (1975) and in many other languages, including  English, French, Italian, German, and Danish. It instructed potential victims of political psychiatry how to behave during interrogation to avoid being diagnosed as mentally ill.

Deportation from the USSR (1976)

The fate of Bukovsky and other political prisoners in the Soviet Union had been repeatedly brought to world attention by Western diplomats and human rights groups such as the relatively new Amnesty International formed in 1961.

In December 1976, Bukovsky was deported from the USSR and exchanged at Zürich airport by the Soviet government for the imprisoned general secretary of the Communist Party of Chile, Luis Corvalán. In his 1978 autobiography Bukovsky describes how he was brought to Switzerland in handcuffs. The widely publicised exchange increased public awareness in the West about Soviet dissidents. A fellow dissident, Vadim Delaunay wrote an epigram on the occasion:

They exchanged a hooligan
For one Luis Corvalan.
Now we need to find a bitch
To exchange her for Ilyich

In March 1977, US President Jimmy Carter met with Bukovsky at the White House. In the USSR the meeting was seen by dissidents and rights activists as a sign of the newly elected president's willingness to stress human rights in his foreign policy; the event provoked harsh criticism by Soviet leaders.

Bukovsky moved to Great Britain where he settled in Cambridge and resumed his studies in biology, disrupted fifteen years earlier (see above) by his expulsion from Moscow University.

Life in the West
Bukovsky gained a master's degree in Biology at Cambridge University. He also wrote and published To Build a Castle: My Life as a Dissenter (1978). (The title in Russian, And the Wind Returns ..., is a Biblical allusion.) The book was translated into English, French and German. It was published in Russian the following year by Chalidze publishers in New York. Today the Russian original is available online via a number of websites.

Since he has lived in the West, Bukovsky has written many essays and polemical articles. These not only criticised the Soviet regime and, later, that of Vladimir Putin, but also exposed "Western gullibility" in the face of Soviet abuses and, in some cases, what he believed to be Western complicity in such crimes. In the late 1970s and early 1980s, following the Soviet invasion of Afghanistan, Bukovsky campaigned successfully for an official UK and US boycott of the summer 1980 Olympics in Moscow. During the same years he voiced concern about the activities and policies of the Western peace movements.

In 1983, together with Cuban dissident Armando Valladares, Bukovsky co-founded and was later elected president of Resistance International. The anti-Communist organisation was run from a small office in Paris by Soviet dissidents and emigres, notably Vladimir Maximov and Eduard Kuznetsov. In 1985 it expanded into the American Foundation for Resistance International. Among the prominent members of the board were Albert Jolis and Jeane Kirkpatrick while Midge Decter, Yuri Yarim-Agaev, Richard Perle, Saul Bellow, Robert Conquest and Martin Colman were on the body's advisory committee. The Foundation aimed to be a co-ordinating centre for dissident and democratic movements seeking to overturn communism in Eastern Europe and elsewhere. It organised protests in the communist countries and in the West, and opposed western financial assistance to communist governments. The Foundation also created the National Council to Support Democratic Movements (National Council for Democracy) with the goal of aiding the emergence of democratic rule-of-law governments, and providing assistance with the writing of constitutions and the formation of civil institutions.

In March 1987, Bukovsky and nine other émigré authors (Ernst Neizvestny, Yury Lyubimov, Vasily Aksyonov and Leonid Plyushch among them) caused a furore in the West and then in the Soviet Union itself when they raised doubts about the substance and sincerity of Mikhail Gorbachev's reforms.

Return to the Soviet Union (1991)
In April 1991, Vladimir Bukovsky visited Moscow for the first time since his deportation fifteen years before.

In the run-up to the 1991 presidential election, Boris Yeltsin's campaign team included Bukovsky on their list of potential vice-presidential running-mates. In the end, army officer Alexander Rutskoy, a veteran of the 1979–1989 war in Afghanistan and Hero of the Soviet Union was selected. On 5 December 1991, both of Bukovsky's Soviet-era convictions were annulled by a decree of the RSFSR Supreme Court. The following year President Yeltsin formally restored Bukovsky's Russian citizenship: he had never been deprived of his Soviet citizenship, despite deportation from the country.

Post-Soviet Union activities
British and European psychiatrists assessing the documents on psychiatric abuse released by Bukovsky characterised him in 1971: "The information we have about [Vladimir Bukovsky] suggests that he is the sort of person who might be embarrassing to authorities in any country because he seems unwilling to compromise for convenience and personal comfort, and believes in saying what he thinks in situations which he clearly knows could endanger him. But such people often have much to contribute, and deserve considerable respect."

Soon after the collapse of the Soviet Union Vladimir Bukovsky was again out of favour with the Russian authorities. He supported Yeltsin against the Supreme Soviet in the 1993 Russian constitutional crisis in October that year but criticised the new Constitution of Russia approved two months later, as being designed to ensure a continuation of Yeltsin's power. According to Bukovsky, Yeltsin became a hostage of the security agencies from 1994 onwards, and a restoration of KGB rule was inevitable.

Judgment in Moscow (1995–2019) 

In 1992, after the dissolution of the Soviet Union, President Yeltsin's government invited Bukovsky to serve as an expert witness at the trial before the Constitutional Court where Russia's communists were suing Yeltsin for banning their Party and taking its property. The respondent's case was that the CPSU itself had been an unconstitutional organisation. To prepare his testimony, Bukovsky requested and was granted access to a large number of documents from the CPSU Central Committee archives (then reorganised into the Central Depository for Contemporary Documentation or TsKhSD). With the help of a small hand-held scanner and a laptop computer, he managed secretly to make photocopies of many of the documents (some with high security clearance), including KGB reports to the Central Committee. The copies were then smuggled to the West.

Bukovsky hoped that an international tribunal in Moscow might play a similar role to the first Nuremberg Trial (1945–1946) in post-Nazi Germany and help the country begin to overcome the legacy of Communism.

It took several years and a team of assistants to piece together the scanned fragments (many only half a page in width) of the hundreds of documents photocopied by Bukovsky and then, in 1999, to make them available online. Many of the same documents were extensively quoted and cited in Bukovsky's Judgment in Moscow (1995), where he described and analysed what he had uncovered about recent Soviet history and about the relations of the USSR and the CPSU with the West.

The book was soon translated into several languages but did not appear in English for over twenty years. Random House bought the rights to the manuscript, but the publisher, in Bukovsky's words, tried to make the author "rewrite the whole book from the liberal left political perspective." Bukovsky resisted, explaining to the Random House editor that he was "allergic to political censorship" because of "certain peculiarities of my biography". (The contract was subsequently cancelled.).

Meanwhile, the book was published in French as Jugement à Moscou (1995), in Russian (1996) and in certain other Slavic languages: for a time the Polish edition became a best-seller. In 2016, it was published in Italian, by Spirali, with the title Gli archivi segreti di Mosca. An English language translation did not appear in book form until May 2019, five months before the author died.

Potential 1992 mayoral candidacy
In 1992, a group of liberal deputies of the Moscow City Council proposed Bukovsky's candidacy for elections of the new Mayor of Moscow, following the resignation of the previous Mayor, Gavriil Popov. Bukovsky refused the offer, stating that to fulfil the mayor's duties he would need a large team of intellectuals committed to radical reform, and there was a lack of such people in the country. Deputy mayor Yury Luzhkov took over, and ran the city from 1992 to 2010.

Potential 1996 presidential candidacy

In early 1996, a group of Moscow academics, journalists and intellectuals suggested that Vladimir Bukovsky should run for President of Russia as an alternative candidate to both incumbent President Boris Yeltsin and his main challenger Gennady Zyuganov of the Communist Party of the Russian Federation. However, no formal nomination process was initiated.

Memento Gulag
In 2001, Bukovsky was elected President of the Comitatus pro Libertatibus – Comitati per le Libertà – Freedom Committees in Florence, an Italian libertarian organisation which promoted an annual Memento Gulag, or Memorial Day devoted to the Victims of Communism, on 7 November (the anniversary of the Bolshevik Revolution). The Memento Gulag has since been held in Rome, Bucharest, Berlin, La Roche sur Yon and Paris.

Contacts with Boris Nemtsov and the Russian Opposition
In 2002, Boris Nemtsov, former Deputy Prime Minister of Russia who was then an elected member of the State Duma and leader of the Union of Rightist Forces, paid a visit to Bukovsky in Cambridge. He wanted to discuss the strategy of the Russian opposition. It was imperative, Bukovsky told Nemtsov, that Russian liberals adopt an uncompromising stand toward what he saw as the authoritarian government of President Vladimir Putin.

On one of journalist Anna Politkovskaya's frequent visits to Britain she interviewed Vladimir Bukovsky and Boris Berezovsky to provide a "comparative analysis of different waves of political emigration". With Bukovsky, "The Patriarch" as he was called in the published version of her article, she discussed the position of those who had gained political asylum in Britain (Ahmed Zakayev, Alexander Litvinenko), and the attitudes of the UK government of Tony Blair and of the European Parliament to the situation in Chechnya. During their talk Bukovsky expressed disapproval of the way in which Slobodan Milosevic was brought before the Hague tribunal.

In January 2004, with Garry Kasparov, Boris Nemtsov, Vladimir V. Kara-Murza and others, Bukovsky was a co-founder of Committee 2008. This umbrella organisation of the Russian democratic opposition was formed to ensure free and fair elections in 2008 when a successor to Vladimir Putin was elected.

In 2005, Bukovsky was among the prominent dissidents of the 1960s and 1970s (Gorbanevskaya, Sergei Kovalyov, Eduard Kuznetsov, Alexander Podrabinek, Yelena Bonner) who took part in a documentary series by Vladimir Kara-Murza Jr. They Chose Freedom. In 2013 Bukovsky was featured in a documentary series by Natella Boltyanskaya Parallels, Events, People.

In 2009, Bukovsky joined the council of the new Solidarnost coalition which brought together a wide range of extra-parliamentary opposition forces.

Criticism of torture in Abu Ghraib prison (Iraq)
As revelations mounted about the sanctioned torture of captives in the Guantánamo Bay detention camp, Abu Ghraib and the CIA secret prisons, Bukovsky entered the discussion with an uncompromising attack on the official if covert rationalisation of torture. In an 18 December 2005 op-ed in The Washington Post, Bukovsky recounted his experience under torture in Lefortovo prison in 1971. Once commenced, he warned, the inertia of torture was difficult to control, corrupting those who carried it out. "Torture", he wrote, "has historically been an instrument of oppression—not an instrument of investigation or of intelligence gathering." Bukovsky explained:

US President Barack Obama repudiated the Torture Memos on 20 January 2009, two days after taking office.

Criticism of the European Union

In EUSSR, a booklet written with Pavel Stroilov and published in 2004, Bukovsky exposed what he saw as the "Soviet roots of European Integration".  Two years later, in an interview with The Brussels Journal, Bukovsky said he had read confidential documents from secret Soviet files in 1992 which confirmed the existence of a "conspiracy" to turn the European Union into a socialist organisation. The European Union was a "monster", he argued, and it must be destroyed, the sooner the better, "before it develops into a full-fledged totalitarian state". As an expression of his Eurosceptic position Bukovsky was vice-president of The Freedom Association (TFA) in the United Kingdom.

Ten years earlier, Bukovsky sketched some of the ways in which cooperation was secured. Beyond those who were recruited as Soviet agents and consciously worked for the USSR, as he explained in Judgment in Moscow (1995), there were men and women whom the KGB and GRU classified as "agents of influence" and "confidential contacts":

This applied equally, Bukovsky cautioned, to post-Stalin generations of specialists on the USSR and Eastern Europe. They had been subjected to similar pressures and inducements in the 1970s and 1980s:

2008 presidential candidacy
In May 2007, Bukovsky announced his plans to run as candidate for president in the May 2008 Russian presidential election. On 16 December 2007, Bukovsky was officially nominated to run against Dmitry Medvedev and other candidates.The group that nominated Bukovsky as a candidate included Yuri Ryzhov, Vladimir V. Kara-Murza, Alexander Podrabinek, Andrei Piontkovsky, Vladimir Pribylovsky and others. Activists, authors and commentators such as Viktor Shenderovich, Valeriya Novodvorskaya and Lev Rubinstein also favoured Bukovsky.

Responding to pro-Kremlin politicians and commentators who expressed doubt about Bukovsky's electoral prospects, his nominators rejected a number of frequently repeated allegations. In Moscow more than 800 citizens of the Russian Federation nominated Bukovsky for president on 16 December 2007. Bukovsky secured the required number of signatures to register and submitted his application to the Central Election Commission on time, 18 December 2007.

Bukovsky's candidacy received the support of Grigory Yavlinsky, who announced on 14 December 2007 at the Yabloko party conference that he would forgo a campaign of his own and would instead support Bukovsky.

The Action Group in support of Bukovsky's candidacy denied claims by pro-government media that Bukovsky had failed in his campaign to become RF President and in appeals before the RF Constitutional Court.

On 22 December 2007, the Central Electoral Commission turned down Bukovsky's application, on the grounds that (1) he had failed to give information about his activities as a writer when submitting his documents, (2) he was holding a British residence permit, and (3) he had not been living in Russia during the past ten years. Bukovsky appealed against the decision at the RF Supreme Court on 28 December 2007 and, subsequently, before its cassation board on 15 January 2008.

On 30 March 2011, Bukovsky requested the arrest of Mikhail Gorbachev by the British authorities after submitting to Westminster Magistrates' Court materials on crimes against humanity that the former Soviet leader had allegedly committed in the late 1980s and early 1990s.

Crimea, Ukraine, Litvinenko Inquiry (2012–2015)
Bukovsky was among the first 34 signatories of "Putin must go", an online anti-Putin manifesto published on 10 March 2010. In May 2012, Vladimir Putin began his third term as president of the Russian Federation after serving four years as the country's prime minister. The following year, Bukovsky published a collection of interviews in Russia which described Putin and his team as The heirs of Lavrentiy Beria, Stalin's last and most notorious secret police chief.

In March 2014 Russia annexed Crimea after Ukraine had lost control of its government buildings, airports and military bases in Crimea to unmarked soldiers and local pro-Russian militias. The West responded with sanctions targeted at Putin's immediate entourage, and Bukovsky expressed the hope that this would prove the end of his regime.

In October 2014, the Russian authorities declined to issue Bukovsky with a new foreign-travel passport. The Russian Foreign Ministry stated that it could not confirm Bukovsky's citizenship. The response was met with surprise from the Presidential Human Rights Council and the Human Rights ombudsman of the Russian Federation.

On 17 March 2015, at the long-delayed inquiry into Alexander Litvinenko's fatal poisoning Bukovsky gave his views as to why the former FSB man had been murdered. Interviewed on BBC TV eight years before, Bukovsky expressed no doubt that the Russian authorities were responsible for the London death of Litvinenko on 23 November 2006.

"Prohibited images" prosecution
In 2015, the UK Crown Prosecution Service announced prosecution of Bukovsky for "prohibited images" of children allegedly found on his computer. Bukovsky's statements about the accusations were inconsistent. According to the prosecutor William Carter, Bukovsky told detectives that he himself had downloaded the images over the course of 15 years. On another occasion, Bukovsky described the accusations as absurd and said that the tip about the images – which he initially said were planted on his computer by a backdoor program – was passed through Europol from Russian security services. Bukovsky also noted that while the original announcement by the CPS accused him of "possession and making", the prosecution materials passed to the court only charged "possession".

In early May 2015, it was reported that Bukovsky had undergone a nine-hour heart operation in a private German clinic, during which he was given two artificial valves. Subsequently, Bukovsky was kept in a medically-induced coma for three days to improve his chances of recovery. After partial recovery from his lengthy heart surgery, Vladimir Bukovsky responded to charges brought against him by the UK Crown Prosecution Service earlier in the year. Issuing a High Court writ for libel, Vladimir Bukovsky said that the CPS had defamed him, and claimed damages of £100,000. Bukovsky was later ruled to be too ill to stand trial.

Death

Bukovsky died of a heart attack on 27 October 2019 at the age of 76 in Cambridge, Cambridgeshire, after a period of ill-health. He is buried on the eastern side of Highgate Cemetery.

Bibliography 

 In translation
 1978:  352 pp.
  1979:  386 pp.
 1979: 
  2007: 
 1987: 
 1995:  616 pp.
 
  (1996) Abrechnung mit Moskau. Das sowjetische Unrechtsregime und die Schuld des Westens, Bergisch Gladbach
 
 Judgment in Moscow: Soviet Crimes and Western Complicity (May 2019)
 1999: Soviet Archives: Online archive compiled by Vladimir Bukovsky, prepared for publication by the late Julia Zaks (1938–2014) and Leonid Chernikhov
 2016: The Bukovsky Archives upgraded version of 1999 archive.
 2019: Judgment in Moscow: Soviet crimes and Western complicity

 In Russian
 1979:  382 pp. The first publication in Russian of Bukovsky's memoirs was given a Biblical title (see Ecclesiastes, v. 6).
 1989:  The first publication of Bukovsky's memoirs in the USSR.
 1996: 
 2001: 
 2007:  (First serialised in Teatr periodical, see above, 1989).
 2008: 
 2013: 
 2014: 
 2015:

Documentaries 
 Bukovsky (1977) – documentary by Alan Clarke.
 They Chose Freedom (2005) (4 parts) – documentary by Vladimir Kara-Murza Jr.
 Russia/Chechnya: Voices of Dissent (2005) – with Bukovsky, Yelena Bonner, Natalya Gorbanevskaya, Anna Politkovskaya, Akhmed Zakayev and others.
 The Soviet Story (2008) – documentary by Edvīns Šnore
 Parallels, Events, People (2014) (36 parts) – documentary series by Natella Boltyanskaya

References

A Chronicle of Current Events (1968–1982)

Other

Further reading

In the Soviet Union

After his expulsion to the West

Two years on

To Build a Castle (1978)

Judgement in Moscow (1995)

In the 21st century

External links

In English

 : May 1989, "The Democratic Revolution in Eastern Europe and the Soviet Union" (forum).
 Vladimir Bukovsky News archives, links, photos, video, public domain writings, official statements, contact info, maintained by US group Bukovsky Center
 Russia/Chechnya: Voices of Dissent (2005) – features Vladimir Bukovsky, Yelena Bonner, Natalya Gorbanevskaya, Anna Politkovskaya, Akhmed Zakayev and others.
  Uploaded on 7 January 2012.
 The Bukovsky Archives: Communism on Trial. Contains over seven hundred classified Soviet documents (1937–1994), an abridged translation of Judgement in Moscow, and many of the author's key articles since 1976 ("Books, Articles & Letters").
 "The suppression of dissent, 1970–1979" in the Bukovsky Archives (above) includes documents concerning Bukovsky: his activities as a Soviet dissident; his periods of imprisonment in the USSR; his exchange in 1976 for Luis Corvalan; and his ongoing campaign in the West against the Soviet regime.
 "Vladimir Bukovsky: Obituary" The Guardian, 28 October 2019.

In Russian
 An Alphabet of Dissent: Bukovsky (2011) 
 Bukovsky on Voice of America (2014) 
  Episode 29: "To Build a Castle", part 1.
  Episode 30: "To Build a Castle", part 2.
 Official 2008 Presidential campaign site

1942 births
2019 deaths
20th-century Russian male writers
20th-century Russian writers
21st-century Russian politicians
21st-century Russian writers
Alumni of King's College, Cambridge
Amnesty International prisoners of conscience held by the Soviet Union
Burials at Highgate Cemetery
Campaign Against Psychiatric Abuse
Cato Institute people
Inmates of Lefortovo Prison
Inmates of Vladimir Central Prison
Members of the Freedom Association
Neurophysiologists
People from Belebey
Psychiatric survivor activists
Russian anti-communists
Russian dissidents
Russian emigrants to the United Kingdom
Russian memoirists
Russian non-fiction writers
Russian political activists
Russian political writers
Russian prisoners and detainees
Solidarnost politicians
Soviet dissidents
Soviet emigrants to the United Kingdom
Soviet expellees
Soviet human rights activists
Soviet male writers
Soviet non-fiction writers
Soviet prisoners and detainees
Soviet psychiatric abuse whistleblowers
Stanford University alumni
Male non-fiction writers